Major Mukund Varadarajan AC (12 April 1983 – 25 April 2014) was an officer in the Rajput Regiment of the Indian Army. In 2014, he was posthumously awarded the Ashok Chakra, India's highest peacetime gallantry award, for killing three terrorists in an encounter at the Shopian district of Jammu and Kashmir.

Personal life

Major Mukund Varadarajan  was born on 12 April 1983 to R.Varadarajan and Geetha. He lived in Chennai, India and had two sisters Swetha and Nithya. Mukund married his longtime girlfriend Indhu Rebecca Varghese on 28 August 2009 . and have a daughter Ashreya born on 17 March 2011. He received his Bachelor of Commerce From Sri Chandrasekharendra Saraswathi Viswa Mahavidyalaya at Enathur and a diploma in journalism from the Madras Christian College, Tambaram. His grandfather and two of his uncles also served in the army and this motivated Varadarajan to join the Armed forces. According to his seniors, the officer had a cutting sharp wit and could outwit anyone in the most polite yet strong way. Men from the unit remember how no matter how long or hard Maj.
Varadarajan's day had been, he was always up for making others feel special on their birthdays and anniversaries. Personal relationships meant a lot to him according the men and officers of his unit.

Army service

Mukund was an alumnus of Officers Training Academy, and after graduating, he received a short-service commission as a Lieutenant in the Rajput Regiment (22 Rajput) on 18 March 2006. On 18 March 2011, he was granted a regular commission with the rank of lieutenant, and received an ante-dated promotion to captain from 18 October 2008. He served at the Infantry School in Mhow, Madhya Pradesh and was part of a United Nations Mission in Lebanon. Promoted major on 18 October 2012, Mukund was deputed to the 44th Battalion of the Rashtriya Rifles that December and posted in the Shupiyan district of Jammu and Kashmir.

Martyrdom 

On 25 April 2014, he led an anti-terrorist cordon and search operation based on intelligence inputs to clear a village in South Kashmir of terrorists. During the operation, his team came under heavy fire. The officer responded swiftly, aware of the setting of darkness which could provide an unprecedented advantage and an opportunity to slip away. Since the exact number of civilians present in the house where unknown to him and his men hence, the use of heavy-calibre weapons were beyond the scope of use. He with his buddy Sepoy Vikram Singh crawled through the orchard in front of the house with a hail of bullets crossings from the two ends over their heads. Having crossed the orchard the buddy pair charged into the house where they were met instantly with intense firing from the terrorist. His forearm was grazed by a bullet. In a quick reaction they changed the settings of their assault rifles and retaliated with a heavy fire killing one of the three terrorists then and there. Maj. Varadarajan knew how the local commander looked like and the dead man wasn't home. The remaining two terrorists including Hizbul Mujahideen top commander charged with grenade explosions and tried to escape from the scene of action. Acting just in time the two men dived to the ground,saving themselves from the shrapnel. In these quick series of events, Maj. Varadarajan saw the face of fleeing militants and recognised in no time one of them as the top commander he was out for hunting, he also saw them making their way to the outhouse next to the building.

Maj. Varadarajan lobbed a grenade into the outhouse. The blast should have debilitated, if not killed commander. But as the two men stormed the outhouse, a volley of fire came smashing into Vikram. It became clear what had just happened—the grenade had killed one terrorist, but there was another with him. The commander wasn't alone when he fled from the debris of the residence and into the cement outhouse—the second terrorist had fled with him. It was this second terrorist who had been killed by the grenade. Hizbul commander had survived.Several rounds of fire were returned at the terrorist, but he was shielded by a row of logs stacked in the outhouse and was able to fire his weapon from the confined space he was in. Maj. Varadarajan saw his buddy collapse to the ground. Vikram Singh had taken two bullets: one had sliced his neck open, while the other had penetrated his jaw. A gunshot through the neck usually spells certain death. Maj. Varadarajan knew he was about to lose one of the most courageous and dependable soldiers in his team. He knew that not only was his buddy through with this fight, his life too was about to end. As in all encounters, there was not a moment for emotion or mourning. Without pausing for a moment, Maj. Varadarajan lunged forward with his AK-47 and sprayed bullets at Altaf Wani, killing him instantly. In those final seconds, some of the militant's shots hit Maj. Varadarajan. ‘He walked out of the outhouse. He looked okay. We thought he was fine,’
recalls an officer in the cordon outside the house. ‘But then he suddenly collapsed.’Nothing about his demeanour betrayed that he had three gunshot wounds and was losing copious amounts of blood from all Then Maj. Varadarajan lost consciousness. Owing to the fact that he was gravely injured during the assault he succumbed to his injuries while being evacuated.

For his brave actions during the operation, he was posthumously awarded the Ashok Chakra, India's highest peacetime gallantry award in 2014, for displaying valor beyond the call of duty. The citation by the Government of India during the declaration of the Ashok Chakra read:

During the operation, before attaining martyrdom, Major Mukund displayed exemplary leadership skills, raw courage, planning and swift action, which culminated in the elimination of the three top ranked Hizbul Mujaheddin terrorists.

Mukund is the fourth recipient of the Ashoka Chakra from the state of Tamil Nadu.

On June 1, 2015, a bust of Major Mukund Varadarajan was unveiled in honor of his patriotism and sacrifice. It is displayed at the Officers Training Academy.

References

1983 births
2014 deaths
Recipients of the Ashoka Chakra (military decoration)
Indian Army personnel
People from Tamil Nadu
Madras Christian College alumni
Ashoka Chakra